The 2011 Durango-Durango Emakumeen Saria was the tenth running of the Durango-Durango Emakumeen Saria, a women's bicycle race held annually in Spain.  It took place on June 7, 2011, with Marianne Vos, Emma Johansson and Judith Arndt taking first, second and third place, respectively.

References

2011 in Spanish road cycling
Durango-Durango Emakumeen Saria
2011 in women's road cycling
June 2011 sports events in Europe